Margarites scintillans is a species of sea snail, a marine gastropod mollusk in the family Margaritidae.

Description
The height of the shell attains 5 mm. The small, thin, white shell has a very depressedly conoidal shape. It is angulated, and tumid on the base. It has a small umbilicus. The aperture is semioval. Its sculpture is perfectly smooth but for some curved puckerings which radiate from the umbilicus, but very soon die out. Above the middle the body whorl is roundly angulated. The color of the shell is pure white, with a transparent calcareous layer over brilliant fiery pearly nacre. The spire is very depressedly conical. The apex is bluntly rounded, with a minute hyaline, depressed embryonic tip. The 4 whorls are barely convex. The suture is slightly impressed. The aperture is semi oval. The thin outer lip is barely angulated at the periphery. The inner lip is straight, patulous, and right-angled at its junction with the base.

Distribution
This marine species occurs off Bermuda and Puerto Rico at depths between 713 m and 1966 m.

References

 Watson, R. B. 1879. Mollusca of H.M.S. 'Challenger' Expedition. Part IV. Zoological Journal of the Linnean Society 14: 692-716.

External links
 To Encyclopedia of Life
 To ITIS
 To World Register of Marine Species

scintillans
Gastropods described in 1879